The women's artistic team all-around event at the 2020 Summer Olympics was held on 25 and 27 July 2021 at the Ariake Gymnastics Centre. There were 12 teams of 4 gymnasts each.

The competition was won by the Russian athletes competing as the Russian Olympic Committee (ROC), the 2016 silver medalists, when they competed as Russia. It was the first women's team all-around title for the Russian team since 1992, when it competed as the Unified Team. They led throughout the competition despite two falls on balance beam in the third rotation. The United States, the two-time defending champions and 2019 world champions, were second. Notably, top American gymnast Simone Biles withdrew from competing following the first rotation due to health concerns, and the three remaining American athletes had to alter their planned lineups and routines. The bronze was won by Great Britain, which displaced Italy from the bronze medal position in the last rotation. Great Britain have not medaled in the women's team all-around since 1928, when they won bronze.

ROC is the first nation to win both the men's and women's team all-around titles at the same Olympics since China did so at the 2008 Summer Olympics.

The medals for the competition were presented by Andrew Parsons, Brazil; IOC Executive Board Member, and the medalists' bouquets were presented by Vasily Titov, Russia; FIG Vice-President.

Background 
This was the 21st appearance of the women's artistic team all-around event. It was first introduced in 1928, not held in 1932, then has been held at every Summer Olympics since 1936.

Qualified teams 
To reach the Olympics, a National Olympic Committee had to earn one of 12 team quota places. These were allocated through the 2018 World Artistic Gymnastics Championships (top three teams) and the 2019 World Artistic Gymnastics Championships (top nine teams, excluding those qualified in 2018). Those 12 teams competed in the qualification round in Tokyo on 25 July, with the top eight advancing to the final.

The following teams qualified for the Olympics by achieving a top three placement at the 2018 World Artistic Gymnastics Championships:

 
 
 

The following teams qualified for the event by achieving a top nine placement among non-qualified teams at the 2019 World Artistic Gymnastics Championships:

Schedule

Qualifications 

The top eight teams in qualifications, based on combined scores of each apparatus, advanced to the final. In the final, each team selected three gymnasts to compete on each apparatus. All scores on each apparatus were summed to give a final team score. The scores in qualification did not carry over to the final.

Final

Notes

References 

Women's artistic team all-around
2020
2021 in gymnastics
Women's events at the 2020 Summer Olympics